Arbutin is a glycoside; a glycosylated hydroquinone extracted from the bearberry plant in the genus Arctostaphylos among many other medicinal plants, primarily in the family Ericaceae. Applied topically, it inhibits tyrosinase and thus prevents the formation of melanin. Arbutin is therefore used as a skin-lightening agent. Very tiny amounts of arbutin are found in wheat, pear skins, and some other foods. It is also found in Viburnum opulus and Bergenia crassifolia. Arbutin was also produced by an in vitro culture of Schisandra chinensis.

It can be prepared synthetically from the reaction of acetobromoglucose and hydroquinone in the presence of alkali.

Folk medicine
Bearberry, which contains arbutin, is a traditional treatment for urinary tract infections.

Skin lightening agent 
Bearberry extract is used in skin lightening treatments designed for long term and regular use. An active agent in brands of skin lightening preparations, it is more expensive than traditional skin lightening ingredients like hydroquinone, which is now banned in many countries. In vitro studies of human melanocytes exposed to arbutin at concentrations below 300 μg/mL reported decreased tyrosinase activity and melanin content with little evidence of cytotoxicity.

Risks
Arbutin is glucosylated hydroquinone, and may carry similar cancer risks, although there are also claims that arbutin reduces cancer risk. The German Institute of Food Research in Potsdam found that intestinal bacteria can transform arbutin into hydroquinone, which creates an environment favorable for intestinal cancer.

See also
 Ferulic acid
 Taxifolin

References 

Phenol glucosides